RISM may refer to:

Répertoire International des Sources Musicales
Directive 2008/96/EC on road infrastructure safety management